Hannah's Creek Primitive Baptist Church is a historic Primitive Baptist church located at Benson, Johnston County, North Carolina.  It was built about 1834 or about 1866, and is a vernacular one-story rectangular, timber-frame building, five bays wide and three bays deep. It rests on a brick pier foundation and has a gable roof.  The building measures 36 feet wide and 48 feet long. The church was moved to its present location in the 1930s.  Also on the property is a contributing church cemetery with burials dating from the late-19th century to 1940.

It was listed on the National Register of Historic Places in 1991.

References

Baptist churches in North Carolina
Churches on the National Register of Historic Places in North Carolina
Churches completed in 1834
Churches in Johnston County, North Carolina
National Register of Historic Places in Johnston County, North Carolina
Primitive Baptists